Gary Wright can refer to:

 Gary Wright (born 1943), American singer
 Gary Wright (cricketer) (born 1970), Australian cricketer
 Gary Wright (ice hockey), American ice hockey coach
 Gary Wright (racing driver) (born 1958), American racing driver